"It's a Jungle Out There" is a song written by Randy Newman and used as the theme song starting with the second season of the TV series Monk. In 2004, it won an Emmy Award for Outstanding Main Title Theme Music. As the first season's theme song "Monk Theme" had won the same award the previous year, Monk became the first series to have two different theme songs win an Emmy for Outstanding Main Title Theme Music in consecutive years. The song is not to be confused with the Harry Nilsson song of the same name from his 1975 album Duit on Mon Dei.

Themes

The lyrics allude to Adrian Monk's plethora of fears and warn that some degree of caution and attention is necessary to stay alive, given everyday life's many dangers. The song was used twice in each episode—but see the exception below.

History
After the end of the first season of Monk, producer David Hoberman approached Randy Newman to create a new theme song. Newman composed the song and played it for Hoberman and Tony Shalhoub. The song debuted in the second season premiere "Mr. Monk Goes Back to School." It remained unpopular with some fans. USA Network reported that they received many complaints from viewers who wanted the series to continue using Jeff Beal's "Monk Theme."   
Some references to this were made in season 2, episode 12, "Mr. Monk and the T.V. Star," where a character is upset about the detective show changing its theme song, and she claims no one else likes the new song. At the end of the episode, Adrian Monk agrees not to change the theme if he ever gets a T.V. show, and the old theme plays at the end of the episode.

Although the theme song remained the same, the clips used in the title sequence changed three times over the course of the series:

 The first version, used from "Mr. Monk Goes Back to School" at the start of season 2 through "Mr. Monk Takes His Medicine" halfway through season 3. This version was used in approximately 25 episodes.
 The third and final version was used starting in season 5 with the episode "Mr. Monk and the Actor" and through the series finale. This version was used for approximately 64 episodes, and brought in clips from season 4 and season 5 episodes.

Newman wrote another song, "When I'm Gone," for the final episode, "Mr. Monk and the End." The song won the 2010 Emmy Award for Outstanding Original Music and Lyrics.

As the show appears on Peacock, the first two-part episode has been edited to include the Randy Newman theme.

Other versions
Snoop Dogg covered the song for the season 6 episode "Mr. Monk and the Rapper", in which he also played a guest role as Murderuss, a rapper accused of murder.

A rerecorded and expanded version of "It's a Jungle Out There" appears on Newman's 2017 album Dark Matter.

Awards
2004 Emmy Award for Outstanding Main Title Theme Music
2005 ASCAP Top TV Series Award

References

2003 songs
Randy Newman songs
Snoop Dogg songs
Television drama theme songs
Comedy television theme songs
Songs written by Randy Newman
Monk (TV series)